Alvin Ernest Pankhurst (born 1949 in Carterton) is a New Zealand magic realist artist.  He is the owner of two galleries of his art in Parnell, Auckland and Pauanui on the Coromandel Peninsula. Pankhurst has been a full-time artist since 1969, starting with the Young Contemporaries Touring Exhibition and the finals in the 1970 National Benson & Hedges Art Competition. Pankhurst won the 1974 Benson & Hedges Art Award with the large tempera on board work "Maybe Tomorrow", was bought by the Dunedin Art Gallery. He lives in Auckland.

Major exhibitions

2001 Royal Academy of Arts summer exhibition 2001. The 233rd., Royal Academy of Arts (London) 2001
2019 8th Beijing Art Biennale - NZ Special Exhibition, Beijing International Art Biennale

References

External links 
Official website

New Zealand painters
People associated with the Museum of New Zealand Te Papa Tongarewa
1949 births
Living people
People from Carterton, New Zealand